Khatgal Airport  is an airport in Khatgal, a town in Khövsgöl Province, Mongolia. It has a gravel runway 15/33 . The small airport building was erected in 2006/2007.

See also
List of airports in Mongolia

Airports in Mongolia
Khövsgöl Province